John David Hellweg (born October 29, 1988) is an American professional baseball pitcher who is a free agent. He has played in Major League Baseball (MLB) for the Milwaukee Brewers and for the Hiroshima Toyo Carp of Nippon Professional Baseball (NPB).

Career

Los Angeles Angels
Hellweg attended St. Dominic High School in O'Fallon, Missouri, and Florida State College at Jacksonville. The Los Angeles Angels of Anaheim selected Hellweg in the 16th round of the 2008 MLB Draft.

Milwaukee Brewers
The Angels traded Hellweg, Jean Segura, and Ariel Peña to the Milwaukee Brewers for Zack Greinke on July 27, 2012.

The Brewers promoted Hellweg to the majors for the first time on June 26, 2013. Hellweg made his Major League debut on June 28, 2013 against the Pittsburgh Pirates. During his debut, he pitched only 1 innings surrendering 7 runs (all in the 2nd inning). He finished the season with a 1-4 record and an unprecedented 9/26 SO/BB ratio.

Hellweg began the 2014 season as the opening day starter for the Brewers Triple A team Nashville Sounds. After 4 starts though, Hellweg would miss the remainder of the season due to injury. Hellweg would return from injury in 2015 to pitch in 16 starts between AA and A (advanced). Through his 16 minor league starts, Hellweg was 1-10 with 52 walks in 61 innings.

San Diego Padres
Hellweg was released by the San Diego Padres on July 4, 2016 after posting an ERA of over 10 in 10 minor league games, including 6 starts.

New Jersey Jackals
On July 8, 2016 Hellweg signed a contract with the New Jersey Jackals of the Canadian American Association of Professional Baseball.

Cincinnati Reds
On November 16, 2016, Hellweg signed a minor league contract with the Cincinnati Reds.

Second stint with New Jersey Jackals
In 2017, Hellweg pitched for the New Jersey Jackals of the Canadian-American "Can-Am" League. In 38 innings, Hellweg struck out 62 while only serving up 2 home runs.

Pittsburgh Pirates
On August 25, 2017, Hellweg signed a minor league deal with the Pittsburgh Pirates. 

On June 25, 2018 Hellweg was released so he could pursue an opportunity in Japan.

Hiroshima Toyo Carp
On June 26, 2018, Hellweg signed with the Hiroshima Toyo Carp of the Nippon Professional Baseball (NPB).

On December 2, 2019, he become free agent.

St. Louis Cardinals
On January 30, 2020, Hellweg signed a minor league deal with the St. Louis Cardinals. On May 27, he was released.

Long Island Ducks
On February 22, 2021, Hellweg signed with the Long Island Ducks of the Atlantic League of Professional Baseball. He became a free agent following the season.

References

External links

1988 births
Living people
Altoona Curve players
American expatriate baseball players in Japan
Arizona League Angels players
Arkansas Travelers players
Baseball players from Ann Arbor, Michigan
Baseball players from Missouri
Biloxi Shuckers players
Brevard County Manatees players
Cedar Rapids Kernels players
El Paso Chihuahuas players
FSC Jacksonville Blue Wave baseball players
Hiroshima Toyo Carp players
Huntsville Stars players
Indianapolis Indians players
Inland Empire 66ers of San Bernardino players
Major League Baseball pitchers
Long Island Ducks players
Milwaukee Brewers players
Nashville Sounds players
New Jersey Jackals players
Nippon Professional Baseball pitchers
People from O'Fallon, Missouri
Phoenix Desert Dogs players
San Antonio Missions players
Wisconsin Timber Rattlers players